Reviving Ophelia may refer to:

 Reviving Ophelia (book), written by psychologist Mary Pipher
 Reviving Ophelia (film), a 2010 film

See also:
 Ophelia (disambiguation)